Bartolomeo Sovero (1576–1629) was a Swiss mathematician.

Works

References

External links 
 

Swiss mathematicians
1576 births
1629 deaths